Knight is a social position and honour originating in the Middle Ages.

Knight may also refer to:

People
 Member of chivalric order
 Knight bachelor
 Knight (surname)
 Pseudonym of Sir Robert Walpole (1676–1745) English statesman

Places
 Knight, United States Virgin Islands, a settlement on the island of Saint Croix
 Knight, Wisconsin, a town in the United States
 Knight Inlet, British Columbia, Canada
 Knight Islands, Nunavut, Canada
 Knights Landing, California

Organisms
 Knight butterfly, the species Lebadea martha
 Knight mushrooms, the genus Tricholoma

In fiction
 Knight (DC Comics), a name adopted by several people in the DC Universe
 Knight (Marvel Comics), a name adopted by several people in the Marvel Universe
 The Knight (novel), a fantasy novel by Gene Wolfe
 Knight, a fictional character in the Duel Masters television show
 Knight, a troop featured in Clash Royale
 Jedi Knight, a rank between Padawan and Master in Star Wars
 Kamen Rider Knight, character from Kamen Rider Ryuki
 The Knight (Canterbury Tales), from Chaucer's Canterbury Tales
 Demon Knight, a 1995 movie
 Michael Knight, the protagonist from Knight Rider

Other
 Knight (chess), a piece in the game of chess
 Knight Capital Group, a global financial services firm
 Knight's Armament Company, an American firearms manufacturer
 Knight (Dungeons & Dragons), a character class in the roleplaying game
 Playing cards, may be:
 Tarot cards:
 Knight of Coins
 Knight of Wands
 Knight of Cups
 Knight of Swords
 Standard 56-card deck (knightly deck) card: Knight (playing card)

See also
 Knights (disambiguation)
 Justice Knight (disambiguation)